Robin Michael Widdows (born 27 May 1942 in Cowley, Middlesex) is a British former racing driver from England.  He participated in Formula One, Formula Two, Formula Three and sportscars including Le Mans.

Widdows began his career with an MG Midget and a Lotus 23 winning the Autosport Class C Championship in 1965. He moved to Formula Three the following year and in 1967 competed in Formula Two with a Brabham BT23, winning the Rhine Cup at Hockenheim. In 1968, Widdows joined The Chequered Flag team to compete in a McLaren M4A and that year took part in his only World Championship Grand Prix, for Cooper, in the British Grand Prix at Brands Hatch but retired with ignition problems. He returned to Formula Two the following season with Bob Gerard and also raced sportscars for Matra. Widdows continued in Formula Two in 1970, with a Brabham, but retired from the sport part way through the season.

Widdows holds the rare distinction of being one of a select group of six who have competed in both a Formula One World Championship race and the Olympic Games (bobsleigh in 1964 and 1968).

Complete Formula One World Championship results
(key)

References

Profile at grandprix.com

1942 births
Living people
English racing drivers
English Formula One drivers
Cooper Formula One drivers
European Formula Two Championship drivers
24 Hours of Le Mans drivers
Olympic bobsledders of Great Britain
Bobsledders at the 1964 Winter Olympics
Bobsledders at the 1968 Winter Olympics
British male bobsledders
World Sportscar Championship drivers